This is a list of years in Bahrain. See also the timeline of Bahraini history.  For only articles about years in Bahrain that have been written, see :Category:Years in Bahrain.

Twenty-first century

Twentieth century

Nineteenth century

Eighteenth century

See also 
 List of years by country

 
Bahrain-related lists
Bahrein